The heights of Le Mort Homme or Dead Man's Hill lie within the French municipality of Cumières-le-Mort-Homme around  north-west of the city of Verdun in France. The hill became known during the Battle of Verdun during the First World War as the site of much fighting.

Location 
The hill has two summits which are named after their height in metres: the northern crest is  265 and the southern one is  295. These names were not used at the time, setting aside that modern survey has measured their heights at 287 and 280 metres respectively. It overlooks the villages of Béthincourt to the north-west, Crow Wood and Cumières to the east and Esnes to the south. It was a great vantage point - the field of view from the hill in all directions was remarkable.

History 
In late February 1916, following German attacks on the right bank of the River Meuse during the Battle of Verdun, the French had established artillery batteries on the hills on the left bank commanding the opposite, right-hand bank. The French artillery caused so many casualties that the Germans decided to attack southwards along the left bank of the river simultaneously to capture  and its neighbouring hills. Over the next few months, the Germans made repeated attacks, pounding the French lines, rushing their positions and ejecting the French from their wrecked trenches. French artillery would then pulverise the Germans and counter-attacks would drive them out again, the French infantry re-occupying the shell holes where the trench systems had been.

German attacks on  304 had begun on 23 March but the French defended it stubbornly, fighting off many attacks. On 9 April, the Germans launched a second assault on both hills, once again the French held and the attack failed. It was not until 6 May that  304 fell, following a 36 hour bombardment that had begun on 3 May and bitter hand-to-hand fighting. After three months of bitter fighting Le Mort Homme was in German hands. The hills would be retaken by the French in August that year.

Today 
From there it is accessible via road. On the summit is a memorial site with monuments, dominated by the 1922 skeleton sculpture by Jacques Froment-Maurice that commemorates the French 69th Division. On the northern hillside are the remains of the German Kronprinz Tunnel (Gallwitz tunnel complex).

References

External links 
 Höhe Toter Mann (Le Mort Homme) (German)
 Topographic structure fragments on Le Mort Homme (German)

History of Lorraine
Battle of Verdun
France in World War I
Landforms of Meuse (department)